The women's triple jump at the 2010 IAAF World Indoor Championships was held at the ASPIRE Dome on 12 and 13 March.

Medalists

Records

Qualification standards

Schedule

Results

Qualification
Qualification: Qualifying Performance 14.20 (Q) or at least 8 best performers (q) advance to the final.

Final

References

Qualification results
Final results

Triple jump
Triple jump at the World Athletics Indoor Championships
2010 in women's athletics